Nat Holt (1893–1971) was an American film producer, best known for making Westerns.

He was under contract to RKO in the 1940s then produced a variety of Westerns that were released by other studios.  In the late 1950s he moved to television producing such series as Tales of Wells Fargo, Shotgun Slade and The Tall Man.

Select filmography
Badman's Territory (1946)
Riffraff (1947)

References

External links

Biography at New York Times
Biography at CTVA

American film producers
1893 births
1971 deaths